Derek Simon Lilley (born 9 February 1974) is a Scottish former footballer, who played as a striker for several clubs in Scotland and England.

He started his career with Greenock Morton, before a big-money move to Premier League side Leeds United. He had loan spells with Hearts and Bury before joining Oxford United.

In 2000, Lilley returned to Scotland with Dundee United, playing with them, Livingston, Morton again, and St. Johnstone, Stirling Albion then finally Forfar Athletic.

Career

Morton & England
Lilley began his career with Greenock Morton and won a move to English Premier League side Leeds United in 1997. His time at Elland Road was frustrating, with only four starts from 21 appearances and only a solitary goal when he replaced Lee Bowyer to score the winner in a 3–2 away win at Barnsley. He spent three months on loan, at Heart of Midlothian and Bury, where again he managed a goal for each club. His goal at Hearts coming in a 2–1 defeat to Dundee, and his goal at Bury coming in a crucial 1–0 win over Oxford United.

A move to Oxford United in 1999–00 helped kick-start his career and his return of nine goals from 63 appearances prompted interest from Dundee United.

Scotland
A move in December 2000 saw him head north to United and a debut goal salvaged a point at home to Rangers, although he would be sent off in his second game against former club Hearts. Ultimately, it was Lilley's last-minute winner at St Johnstone which saved United from relegation and his six goals in the half-season would cement his status with the fans. The following season, Lilley would manage just six goals, despite a hat-trick against St Johnstone and only two league goals in 2002–03 spelled the end of his time at Tannadice.

A move to Livingston followed in 2003–04 and a rejuvenated Lilley scored 12 league goals, plus four in the Scottish League Cup – including the winning goal in the semi-final against Dundee and one in the final win against Hibernian – and a hat-trick in the Scottish Cup against Spartans. This earned him the nickname of "The Goal Machine." 2004–05 was a different story, however and Lilley's three goals were not enough to earn him a new contract.

Lilley returned to first club Morton for 2005–06 and managed twelve league goals as Morton narrowly lost in the play-off semi-finals. In 2006–07, he had managed four league goals by the turn of the year.

On 26 January 2007, his contract was terminated by Morton, and he signed for St. Johnstone. After making fourteen appearances for Saints (all as a substitute), Lilley was released by the club at the end of the season. On 7 June 2007, Lilley signed for newly promoted First Division side Stirling Albion. Lilley only played a handful of games for Stirling Albion before being released at the end of the season.

Lilley signed for Forfar Athletic in June 2008, going on to score three goals against East Stirlingshire and Berwick in the league and Partick Thistle in the League Cup, before being released at the end of the 2008–09 season.

Career statistics

Honours

Livingston
 Scottish League Cup: 1
 2003–04

Greenock Morton
 Scottish Second Division: 2
 2006–071994–95

See also
 Dundee United F.C. season 2000–01
 Dundee United F.C. season 2001–02
 Dundee United F.C. season 2002–03

References

External links
 
  Profile at londonhearts.com

1974 births
Footballers from Paisley, Renfrewshire
Living people
Greenock Morton F.C. players
Leeds United F.C. players
Heart of Midlothian F.C. players
Bury F.C. players
Oxford United F.C. players
Dundee United F.C. players
Livingston F.C. players
St Johnstone F.C. players
Stirling Albion F.C. players
Forfar Athletic F.C. players
Scottish footballers
Premier League players
English Football League players
Scottish Premier League players
Scottish Football League players
Association football forwards
People educated at Park Mains High School
Scotland youth international footballers